"Colour of Love" is a song by German Eurodance group Snap!, released in December 1991 as the first single from their second studio album, The Madman's Return (1992). It features vocals by American singer-songwriter Thea Austin and rap by Turbo B, and received positive reviews from music critics, many of them naming it a standout of the album. Quite successful on the charts in Europe, the song became a top 10 hit in at least 11 countries, as well as on the Eurochart Hot 100, where it peaked at number eight. The accompanying music video was filmed in Death Valley, California.

Critical reception
AllMusic named "Colour of Love" one of the "standout" tracks from The Madman's Return. J.D. Considine from The Baltimore Sun felt it's the only track "that comes even close to the group's early vigor". Ken Capobianco from The Boston Globe complimented Thea Austin's "colorful" voice, describing the song as "a meek but graceful look at interracial love." Clark and DeVaney from Cashbox named it one of two "stand out" cuts from the album, remarking that the sounds that are offered on this album have a little more depth and variety compared to their last release. 

Machgiel Bakker from Music & Media wrote that it "pairs a bass-heavy and soothing Massive-type of production to rapper Turbo's firm vocals. The soulful female vocals provided by Thea Austin makes the song an easy add-on for EHR formats." A reviewer from Melody Maker described it as "dreamy" and named it the "highlight" of the LP. Newcastle Evening Chronicle noted that a "slow menacing opening gives way to a mix of soul and Turbo B's rap". The newspaper also noted that the "macho" rap contrasts with the new singer's "catchy" soul vocal. Rozalla Miller reviewed the song for Smash Hits, commenting, "I like the beat a lot, very groovy. Snap are really good. I've liked lots of their records up until now, and this one sounds like one of the best."

Chart performance
"Colour of Love" was quite successful on the charts in Europe, reaching the top 5 in Austria (4), Italy (3), Portugal (3), Spain (5) and Switzerland (4), and the top 10 in Denmark (8), Germany (9), Greece (8), the Netherlands (6), Norway (6) and Sweden (6). In Belgium, it peaked within the top 20, as number 14 in both Flanders and Wallonia. In the UK, the single was less successful, reaching number 54. On Music Weeks dance singles chart, it climbed to number 23. On both the Eurochart Hot 100 and the European Dance Radio Chart, "Colour of Love" peaked at number eight in February 1992. Outside Europe, it charted in both Australia and New Zealand, where it peaked at number 66 and 36, respectively.

Music video
A music video was produced to promote the single, directed by Angel and filmed in Death Valley, California. The video begins with Turbo B and two others riding on motorcycles through a desert landscape on a bright day. Thea Austin sings standing on a rocky mantle with a cape. Dancers perform actobats and dance on rocks. Some of them wear masks and has body paint. As the video ends, it has become night in the desert, while Austin still performs.

Track listings
 7-inch single (Logic 114 678)
 "Colour of Love" (Massive 7"/Radio Version) – 3:57
 "Colour of Love" (Smoove 7") – 3:59

 CD maxi' (Logic 664 678)
 "Colour of Love" (Massive 7") – 3:57
 "Colour of Love" (Massive Version) – 5:30
 "Colour of Love" (String Mix) – 5:05
 "Colour of Love" (Smoove Version) – 5:29

Charts

Weekly charts

Year-end charts

References

1991 singles
1991 songs
Arista Records singles
English-language German songs
Logic Records singles
Music videos directed by Angel (director)
Snap! songs